Yordan Todorov may refer to:

 Yordan Todorov (footballer, born July 1981), Bulgarian footballer for ESV Regensburg
 Yordan Todorov (footballer, born November 1981), Bulgarian footballer for Kom
 Yordan Todorov (footballer, born 1999), Bulgarian footballer for Lokomotiv Sofia on loan from Septemvri Sofia